Jackass Number Two is a 2006 American reality slapstick comedy film directed by Jeff Tremaine. It is the sequel to Jackass: The Movie (2002), both based upon the MTV series Jackass. Like its predecessor and the original television show, the film is a compilation of stunts, pranks and skits, starring the regular Jackass cast of Johnny Knoxville, Bam Margera, Ryan Dunn, Wee Man, Dave England, Chris Pontius, Steve-O, Preston Lacy, and Ehren McGhehey.

Produced by MTV Films, Dickhouse Productions and Lynch Siderow Productions, and distributed by Paramount Pictures, the film premiered in theaters on September 22, 2006, received generally positive reviews from critics and grossed $84.6 million worldwide against a production budget of $11.5 million.

Unused material of the film was released as a separate movie titled Jackass 2.5 online on December 19, 2007, and on DVD on December 26, 2007. It was followed by another sequel, Jackass 3D (2010).

Synopsis
The film opens by introducing the primary cast members while bulls aggressively chase them in a suburban neighborhood.

The most notable stunts include; Johnny Knoxville sitting on a big red rocket which gets launched into the air, Bam Margera being stuck in a trailer with a cobra, Chris Pontius' penis dressed as a mouse while a snake attempts to bite it, Steve-O getting his cheek pierced by a fish hook and getting thrown into the shark infested Gulf of Mexico, Ryan Dunn being launched into a garage door while riding a shopping cart, Dave England riding a giant firehose that launches him into a patch of mud, Wee Man getting zapped by an electric stool upon believing that cards are being thrown at him, Ehren McGhehey attempting a loop while riding a pocketbike, and Preston Lacy disguising himself as Bam's father Phil to spoon with Bam's mother April in bed.

The final bit is a prank orchestrated by the cast on Ehren McGhehey in which he dresses up as a terrorist along with cinematographer Dimitry Elyashkevich, and take a taxi to the airport and convince the driver that they are going to blow up a plane. In reality, the driver is swapped with director/actor Jay Chandrasekhar, who becomes violent with Ehren when he attempts to initiate the prank. The taxi pulls into a vacant lot where a panicked Ehren is forced into the trunk and Jay drives around the lot in circles. When the car comes to a stop, Ehren is relieved to discover that it is a prank and was not in serious danger. However, it is also revealed to Ehren that the beard that was put on him as part of the bit was made up of pubic hair by a majority of the cast and crew, one of whom happened to have crabs, after which Ehren gets angry and dry heaves.

The movie concludes with Johnny Knoxville putting his hand in a bear trap, before transitioning into a performance by the main cast in a Busby Berkeley-style movie musical production number set to the La Cage aux Folles song "The Best of Times", where the guys sing and dance while performing more stunts. After a wrecking ball hits Knoxville, Rip Taylor appears to end the movie much like in the predecessor.

Cast
The entire main cast from Jackass: The Movie returned for the sequel.

Guest appearances

Crew 
Crew members who appear in this movie:
 Director and producer Jeff Tremaine
 Producer Spike Jonze
 Executive producer Trip Taylor
 Co-producer and cinematographer Dimitry Elyashkevich
 Co-producer and photographer Sean Cliver
 Cameramen Lance Bangs, Rick Kosick, Greg "Guch" Iguchi, and Mark Rackley
 Photographer Ben "Benzo" Kaller
 Sound mixer Cordell Mansfield
 Boom operator Seamus Frawley
 Art director J.P. Blackmon
 Property master Scott Manning

Stunts including Jackass and Viva La Bam regular Don Vito were also filmed and shown in original trailers. However, due to the scandal surrounding his arrest just prior to the film's release and the nature of the charges against him, all the scenes involving Don Vito were cut at the last minute and have never been released since.

Notable exceptions to the supporting cast are Raab Himself, who was battling alcoholism and drug addiction at the time, and Rake Yohn, who did however appear in the film's sequel Jackass 2.5. They both were recurring cast members in the Jackass TV show and in the first Jackass movie. Ryan Dunn initially approached Raab to appear in the movie, however, he declined the offer.

Production
Shooting began on January 30, 2006, and ended on June 23, 2006. During filming, the Jackass cast refused to divulge their various locations, out of fear of fans interfering with the filming process.  Notable filming locations include India, Australia, England, Moscow and Argentina. A few insights were leaked prior to the movie's release by Steve-O and Bam Margera via Radio Bam and Loveline. Other shootings were Bull Shoals, Arkansas; Key West, Florida; Los Angeles, California; Miami, Florida; New Orleans, Louisiana; New York City, New York; and West Chester, Pennsylvania. Even after completing enough footage for Number Two, Knoxville was so engerized by being back together with his friends and shooting again, that he encouraged everyone to stay together and film more stunts (most of which ultimately released with 2.5), willing to even put himself at further risk of injury simply because he didn't want to part with the group so soon.

The infamous stunt "How to Milk a Horse" was originally shot for Wildboyz, but was saved for future use. "The idea to drink the horse semen was not actually planned but was "in the back of everyone's mind." To agree to do the stunt, Chris Pontius asked director Jeff Tremaine for a full day off of work, but discouraged doing so since Pontius had missed work the day before. Additionally on screen Chris Pontius stated to Jeff Tremaine "This is going to make up for something bad I'm going to do in the future." This deal was verbally agreed upon and sealed with a handshake; it should also be noted that said deal was videotaped for the camera.

Deleted scenes that were also filmed but not included in either the final film or Jackass 2.5 include: "The Lamborghini Tooth Pull" with Don Vito (which would later be performed in Jackass 3D by Ehren McGhehey); "The Human Newton's Cradle", where Preston Lacy, Bam Margera, Phil Margera, Don Vito, and Brandon DiCamillo were the "spheres" for a life size Newton's cradle; "Meatball Sling Shot", where Bam slingshots a meatball in Vito's face (which was also performed by Phil Margera and included in Jackass 2.5); "SWAT Team Wake Up", where a SWAT Team wakes Johnny Knoxville up by blowing the door to his motel room; "Wee Baby", where Wee Man is dressed as a baby and put in a box in an attempt to get shipped out through the mail; "Unicycle Hellride", where Steve-O rides a unicycle over hot coals; "Balloon Flight", where Bam has balloons tied to him which causes him to float in the sky, he then uses a pellet gun to shoot the balloons with to slowly descend into a lake; and "Ignited Farts", where Bam, Steve-O, Ryan Dunn, Chris Pontius, and Dave England would get in a bathtub and try to ignite their farts underwater, ending with Dave defecating by accident (this stunt would later be performed by Steve-O in Jackass Forever). Although they were deleted, some of the deleted scenes are briefly shown in the credits and/or the making of Jackass Number Two and Jackass 2.5. A short clip of the tooth pull scene appeared in the original trailer for Jackass Number Two, a photo of the human Newton's cradle was released, and the entire "Ignited Farts" sequence was once available on the Jackass World website, but has since disappeared following the websites closure.

Screenings and release
The film had 4 different screenings for fans of Jackass and MySpace users, which was a part of MySpace's "Black Carpet" screening. The screenings took place a few days before the movie was released (possibly August). Some of the screenings also had surprise visits by cast and crew. For example, the Pennsylvania screening had director Jeff Tremaine and cast members Johnny Knoxville and Bam Margera.

On June 15, 2006, Yahoo! released the first official teaser for the movie. The stunts in the trailer included Knoxville riding a "rocket bike" off a ramp and a blindfolded Knoxville being rammed by a yak.

The film was released on DVD on December 26, 2006, in its R-rated version in full and widescreen, and in widescreen in the unrated version.

Box office
Jackass Number Two opened on September 22, 2006, in 3,900 screens at 3,059 theaters. It debuted at number one on its opening weekend with a total gross of $29 million. On its first day in theaters Jackass Number Two matched its $11.5 million production budget. The film grossed an additional $14 million in its second week. Overall the film made $84.6 million worldwide, nearly $5 million more than the original.

Critical reception
Review aggregator website Rotten Tomatoes reports a 64% approval rating from 103 critic reviews; the average rating is 6.00/10. The general consensus reads: "Better than any sequel to the movie of a television show has a right to be, Jackass Number Two dares you not to laugh." On Metacritic, the film has a rating of 66 out of 100 based on 23 critics, indicating "generally favorable reviews". Audiences polled by CinemaScore gave the film an average grade of "B+" on an A+ to F scale.

The New York Times awarded Jackass Number Two a Critic's Pick, writing, "Debased, infantile and reckless in the extreme, this compendium of body bravado and malfunction makes for some of the most fearless, liberated and cathartic comedy in modern movies." On  Ebert & Roeper, Richard Roeper and guest critic Fred Willard gave Jackass Number Two  a "Two Thumbs Up" rating.

Soundtrack

The soundtrack was released on September 26, 2006, by Bulletproof Records. The soundtrack features songs that were featured in the movie, and various audio clips from the movie. Among the new songs included in the soundtrack are "Gettin' Fucked Up" – a collaboration between rap group Three Six Mafia (who themselves briefly appear in the film) and Josey Scott, lead singer of heavy metal band Saliva – and "Backass" – a collaboration between electroclash musician Peaches and Karen O, lead singer of the indie rock trio Yeah Yeah Yeahs.

Home media
The Rated and Unrated DVD versions of the movie were released on December 26, 2006. The rated version includes the 96 minute theatrical release, with bonus features, and the unrated includes extended scenes that were shortened in the original movie. Both DVDs feature commentary by the cast (with the exception of Bam Margera), director and producer Jeff Tremaine, and co-producer and cinematographer Dimitry Elyashkevich. The DVD also included 16 deleted scenes removed from the theatrical release, more than 20 additional scenes, 9 TV spots, 8 promotional spots including the theatrical trailer, gag reel, the uncensored version of Karazy by Chris Pontius and a promotional commercial for the 2006 VMAs. The Making of Jackass featurette is also featured on the DVD.

Jackass 2.5
Jackass 2.5  was a direct-to-home media version with additional footage (in this case, both intentionally for 2.5 and footage they were unable to include for Number Two). It was released to the Internet at Blockbuster.com and Hulu as a free screening on December 19–31, 2007, and to DVD on December 26, 2007. It includes special features such as the making of Jackass 2.5, the making of Jackass: The Game, deleted scenes, photo gallery, and additional footage.

The most notable bits include:  Johnny Knoxville getting a prostate exam at a clinic in Russia; Bam Margera flying a kite out of his anus with anal beads; toy airplanes attacking Preston Lacy while he is painted as King Kong; Dave England and Ehren McGhehey boxing with after getting violently spun on office chairs; Wee Man bullfighting against a calf; a snapping turtle biting Chris Pontius on the nose; Steve-O drinking beer off Shridhar Chillal's nails; Ryan Dunn getting a golf ball teed off of him, and the Jackass team going through an obstacle course with alligators, pigs and paintball shots.

Sequel

Paramount Pictures and MTV Films greenlit a third Jackass, which was shot in 3D.  Filming began in January 2010 and it was released on October 15, 2010.

References

External links

 
 
  
 
 
 2007 SuicideGirls interview with Jackass Number Two director Jeff Tremaine by Daniel Robert Epstein
 

2006 comedy films
2006 films
American comedy films
Dickhouse Productions films
2000s English-language films
Films based on television series
Films directed by Jeff Tremaine
Films shot in New York City
Films shot in Los Angeles
Films with screenplays by Johnny Knoxville
Films shot in India
Jackass (film series)
Jackass (TV series)
MTV Films films
Paramount Pictures films
2000s American films